Barbara Byrne is an American rower. In the 1995 World Rowing Championships, she won a gold medal in the women's lightweight coxless four event. She also won a bronze medal in the 1993 World Rowing Championships in the same event.

References

External links

American female rowers
World Rowing Championships medalists for the United States
Year of birth missing (living people)
Living people
21st-century American women